Florin Vasile Axinia (also known as Florin Axinia II, born 28 January 1974) is a Romanian former professional footballer who played as a striker. Except for two halves of seasons played at Național București, Axinia played all his career for Ceahlăul Piatra Neamț, for which he scored 82 goals in 293 matches, ensuring his presence in the club's hall of fame. Axinia is the all-time goalscorer of Ceahlăul and also was the captain of the team in 72 matches. His brother Gheorghe Axinia was also a footballer, they played together at Ceahlăul Piatra Neamț. In 2006, Gelu Crăcană, a fan of Ceahlăul Piatra Neamț created a 420-square-meter (500 including the sleeves) Ceahlăul Piatra Neamț jersey shirt with Florin Axinia's name on it which entered the Guinness World Records Hall of fame. In 2008 Axinia suffered a stroke, but after which he fully recovered.

Honours
Ceahlăul Piatra Neamț
Divizia B: 1992–93

Notes

References

1974 births
Living people
Romanian footballers
Association football forwards
Liga I players
Liga II players
CSM Ceahlăul Piatra Neamț players
FC Progresul București players
Sportspeople from Piatra Neamț